is a Japanese former speed skater who competed in the 1952 and 1956 Winter Olympics.

He was born in Nagano Prefecture.

In 1952 he finished tenth in the 5000 metres competition and 14th in the 10000 metres event.

Four years later he finished 23rd in the 10000 metres contest, 27th in the 5000 metres competition, and 39th in the 1500 metres event at the 1956 Games.

External links
 

1933 births
Japanese male speed skaters
Speed skaters at the 1952 Winter Olympics
Speed skaters at the 1956 Winter Olympics
Olympic speed skaters of Japan
Waseda University alumni
Sportspeople from Nagano Prefecture
Living people